Doc Wadley Stadium located in Tahlequah, Oklahoma is the home stadium of the NCAA Division II college football team the RiverHawks of Northeastern State University.

The University also has consented to allow Doc Wadley Stadium to be used for other purposes—for example, the  Tahlequah High School football team (the Tahlequah Tigers) schedules their home games there and the field is also used for marching band contests. The Tahlequah City Vipers are an adult amateur team that also leases the stadium. 

Doc Wadley Stadium recently underwent a $3.5 million renovation which included an expanded seating capacity to 8,300, installing artificial turf, installing a video scoreboard, and additional restrooms and concession areas.

References

External links 
 Description of Gable Field with recent renovations at the NSU Sports webpage
 Reference to NSU's listing as an NCAA Division II school
 Tahlequah High School homepage

College football venues
Northeastern State RiverHawks football
Buildings and structures in Tahlequah, Oklahoma
American football venues in Oklahoma